Chris Pinnock (born 26 March 1979) is a Jamaican hurdler.

He finished fifth at the 2006 Commonwealth Games. He also competed at the World Championships in 2003 and 2005 as well as the 2004 Olympic Games without reaching the final round.

His personal best time is 13.38 seconds, achieved in May 2003 in Austin. The national record belongs to Maurice Wignall with 13.17 seconds.

References

External links

1979 births
Living people
Jamaican male hurdlers
Athletes (track and field) at the 2004 Summer Olympics
Athletes (track and field) at the 2006 Commonwealth Games
Olympic athletes of Jamaica
Commonwealth Games competitors for Jamaica